Tyrosine ammonia lyase (EC 4.3.1.23, L-tyrosine ammonia-lyase, TAL or Tyrase) is an enzyme in the natural phenols biosynthesis pathway. It transforms L-tyrosine into p-coumaric acid.
     + Ammonia + H+
L-tyrosine = trans-p-hydroxycinnamate + NH3

See also 
  EC 4.3.1.24 (phenylalanine ammonia-lyase)
 EC 4.3.1.25 (phenylalanine/tyrosine ammonia-lyase)

References

External links 
 
 www.hhmi.org

EC 4.3.1
Hydroxycinnamic acids metabolism